This article lists the presidents of the Cortes of Castilla–La Mancha, the regional legislature of Castilla–La Mancha.

Presidents

References
 

Castilla-La Mancha